The Legend of Krishna is a novel written by Nigel Frith and published in 1975 by Sheldon Press. It was published again in 1985 by Unwin under the title Krishna.

Plot summary
Krishna is a novel in which the story of Krishna is retold.

Reception
Colin Greenland reviewed Krishna for Imagine magazine, and stated that "Start practising those finger-cymbals now."

Reviews
Review by Brian Stableford (1985) in Fantasy Review, June 1985
Review by Chris Bailey (1985) in Paperback Inferno, #55

References

1975 British novels
1975 fantasy novels
Krishna in popular culture